Blackburn with Darwen Borough Council elections are held three years out of every four, with a third of the council being elected each time. Blackburn with Darwen Borough Council is the local authority for the unitary authority of Blackburn with Darwen in Lancashire, England. Since the last boundary changes in 2017, 51 councillors have been elected from 17 wards.

Political control
From 1889 to 1974, Blackburn was a county borough, independent from any county council. Under the Local Government Act 1972 a larger Blackburn district was created, gaining the neighbouring town of Darwen and several other rural parishes, and becoming a non-metropolitan district, with Lancashire County Council providing county-level services. The first election to the reformed borough council was held in 1973, initially operating as a shadow authority until the new arrangements took effect on 1 April 1974. The district was renamed Blackburn with Darwen in 1997 and became a unitary authority on 1 April 1998, becoming independent from Lancashire County Council. Political control of the council since 1973 has been held by the following parties:

Non-metropolitan district

Unitary authority

Leadership
The leaders of the council since 1993 have been:

Council elections
1973 Blackburn Borough Council election
1976 Blackburn Borough Council election
1979 Blackburn Borough Council election (New ward boundaries)
1980 Blackburn Borough Council election
1982 Blackburn Borough Council election
1983 Blackburn Borough Council election
1984 Blackburn Borough Council election
1986 Blackburn Borough Council election
1987 Blackburn Borough Council election
1988 Blackburn Borough Council election
1990 Blackburn Borough Council election
1991 Blackburn Borough Council election
1992 Blackburn Borough Council election
1994 Blackburn Borough Council election (Borough boundary changes took place but the number of seats remained the same)
1995 Blackburn Borough Council election
1996 Blackburn Borough Council election
1997 Blackburn with Darwen Borough Council election (New ward boundaries)
1999 Blackburn with Darwen Borough Council election
2000 Blackburn with Darwen Borough Council election
2002 Blackburn with Darwen Borough Council election
2003 Blackburn with Darwen Borough Council election
2004 Blackburn with Darwen Borough Council election (New ward boundaries increased the number of seats by 2)
2006 Blackburn with Darwen Borough Council election
2007 Blackburn with Darwen Borough Council election
2008 Blackburn with Darwen Borough Council election
2010 Blackburn with Darwen Borough Council election
2011 Blackburn with Darwen Borough Council election
2012 Blackburn with Darwen Borough Council election
2014 Blackburn with Darwen Borough Council election
2015 Blackburn with Darwen Borough Council election
2016 Blackburn with Darwen Borough Council election
2018 Blackburn with Darwen Borough Council election (New ward boundaries)
2019 Blackburn with Darwen Borough Council election
2021 Blackburn with Darwen Borough Council election
2022 Blackburn with Darwen Borough Council election

By-election results

2002-2006

2006-2010

2010-2014

2014-2018

2018-2022

References

 By-election results

External links
Blackburn with Darwen Council

 
Local government in Blackburn with Darwen
Politics of Blackburn with Darwen
Council elections in Lancashire
Blackburn with Darwen
Blackburn with Darwen